Karl (Carl) Freiherr von Urban (born 31 August 1802 in Cracovia; died 1 January 1877 in Brno) was an Austrian feldmarschall-leutnant.

In command of a 1,500-strong force of Grenz infantry he suppressed the 10,000-strong revolt of the Székelys, and on 18 November 1848 he defeated the insurgents at Klausenburg.

During the Italian Campaign of 1859, von Urban was ordered to check Garibaldis Alpine Hunters on the Austrian right flank. Due to the Franco-Sardinian advance after the Battle of Magenta and the defeats at the Battle of Varese and San Fermo, von Urban retreated to the Mincio. After the Battle of Solferino, von Urban was appointed supreme commander over Verona.

Von Urban committed suicide on 1 January 1877 in Brno.

Sources

1802 births
1877 deaths
Field marshals of Austria
Barons of Austria
Military personnel from Kraków
Austrian military personnel who committed suicide
Knights Cross of the Military Order of Maria Theresa